The Cebu Declaration on East Asian Energy Security was signed by 16 nations after a three-hour meeting of delegates at the 2nd East Asia Summit in Cebu on January 15, 2007. The countries have agreed to promote energy security and find energy alternatives to conventional fuels.

The Declaration lists a series of goals aimed at providing "reliable, adequate and affordable" energy supplies. It was signed by the 10 ASEAN members (Indonesia, Malaysia, Philippines, Singapore, Thailand, Brunei, Vietnam, Laos, Burma and Cambodia), as well as China, Japan, New Zealand, India, South Korea and Australia.

This was followed by the Singapore Declaration on Climate Change, Energy and the Environment at the 3rd East Asia Summit.

See also

Second EAS
Renewable energy
Climate change

Notes

ASEAN laws
Environmental treaties
Energy security
Energy development
Energy treaties
Treaties concluded in 2007
2007 in the environment
Treaties of Indonesia
Treaties of Malaysia
Treaties of the Philippines
Treaties of Singapore
Treaties of Thailand
Treaties of Brunei
Treaties of Vietnam
Treaties of Laos
Treaties of Myanmar
Treaties of Cambodia
Treaties of the People's Republic of China
Treaties of Japan
Treaties of New Zealand
Treaties of India
Treaties of South Korea
Treaties of Australia
History of Cebu City
Mass media companies
2007 establishments in Singapore
2007 in politics